The 1999 Ebonyi State gubernatorial election occurred in Nigeria on January 9, 1999. The PDP nominee Sam Egwu won the election, defeating the APP candidate.

Sam Egwu emerged PDP candidate.

Electoral system
The Governor of Ebonyi State is elected using the plurality voting system.

Primary election

PDP primary
The PDP primary election was won by Sam Egwu.

Results
The total number of registered voters in the state was 902,327. Total number of votes cast was 517,893, while number of valid votes was 505,862. Rejected votes were 12,031.

References 

Ebonyi State gubernatorial elections
Ebonyi State gubernatorial election
Ebonyi State gubernatorial election
Ebonyi State gubernatorial election